Crumbley is a surname. People with this surname include:

 Alex Crumbley (1909–1938), American baseball player 
 Elmer Crumbley (1908–1993), American trombonist
 Ethan Crumbley (born 2006), perpetrator of the 2021 Oxford High School shooting 
 James Crumbley (born 1976) and Jennifer Crumbley (born 1978), parents and suspected collaborators of Ethan 
 George Crumbley (1923–2009), founder of the Peach Bowl, an American football competition

See also

 Greg Crumbly, American artist